Joost de Soete or de Zoete, Lord of Villers or Villiers, (1510–1520, Sluis – March 1589, The Hague) was a Dutch nobleman and Field Marshal  who fought in the early years of the Eighty Years' War.

De Soete was the third son Alexander de Zoete, knight and governor of Zeeland, and Johanna van Ranst, lady of Hautin, who had married in 1502.

In 1580, he was Commander of Bouchout. In March 1589 he was mortally wounded at the battle at Geertruidenberg. He was brought to The Hague where he soon died.

His coat of arms were a black twill with silver chevron.

References

1510s births
1589 deaths
Dutch people of the Eighty Years' War (United Provinces)
People from Sluis